Anapurus is a municipality in the state of Maranhão in the Northeast region of Brazil.

In February 2012, debris from an Ariane 4 rocket, originally launched in 1997, fell out of orbit and landed in Anapurus.

See also
List of municipalities in Maranhão

References

Municipalities in Maranhão